Scarpe may refer to:

Scarpe river, in France
Battle of the Scarpe (disambiguation), four Battles of the Scarpe were fought during World War I
USS Scarpe (SP-713), a United States Navy ship
Scarpe Mountain

See also
Scarp (disambiguation)